Freizeit-Land Geiselwind is an amusement park near Geiselwind, Germany.
Covering 55 hectares, the park offers over 100 attractions, including 6 roller coasters.

History 
The park was founded in 1969 by Ernst Mensinger under the name "Vogel-Pony-Märchenpark" (fairy tale park with birds and ponies). It was opened next to a newly buildt section of the Federal Motorway A3. In the beginning, the park had a focus on animals. Later, more and more amusement rides were added. For several decades Acapulco divers entertained the visitors.         

The new owner after the death of Mensinger in 2017 is Matthias Mölter.

Roller Coasters 

The last four roller coasters don't have an inversion. Cobra has one inversion and Boomerang three (six per ride).

Further attractions 

This list of attractions is incomplete.

Gallery

References

External links

Official website

Amusement parks in Germany
Amusement parks opened in 1969
Tourist attractions in Bavaria